Zewde Hailemariam (in some sources Zewdie, Haile Mariam; born 22 September 1962) is a former Ethiopian middle distance runner who specialised in 800 meters, and 400 meters hurdles events. She won four medals in three different African Championships in Athletics from 1989 and 1992, including one gold in 800 metres at the 1992 edition in June of that year. Only a month later she competed for Ethiopia at the 1992 Summer Olympics in the same event, but ran 2:11.60, more than five seconds slower than at the continental championships, and finished sixth in her qualifying heat, failing to progress to the semi-finals. As of 2016, Hailemariam still holds the Ethiopian national 400 m hurdles record (57.60) she ran at the 1987 All-Africa Games in Nairobi.

Achievements

References

External links

1962 births
Living people
Olympic athletes of Ethiopia
Athletes (track and field) at the 1992 Summer Olympics
Ethiopian female middle-distance runners
African Games silver medalists for Ethiopia
African Games medalists in athletics (track and field)
African Games bronze medalists for Ethiopia
Athletes (track and field) at the 1987 All-Africa Games
Athletes (track and field) at the 1991 All-Africa Games
20th-century Ethiopian women